HNLMS Gelderland may refer to the following ships of the Royal Netherlands Navy:

 , a  protected cruiser
 , a 

Royal Netherlands Navy ship names